Stephen Olney (October 12, 1755, North Providence, Rhode Island – November 23, 1832) was a soldier in the Continental Army during the American Revolutionary War and later a Rhode Island legislator.

Biography

Stephen Olney entered the service as an ensign in Hitchcock's Regiment (14th Continentals) May 1775, joining the Continental Army's 11th Continental Infantry in January, 1776 as a Lieutenant and participating in the siege of Boston, battles of Long Island, Harlem Heights, White Plains, Second Trenton, and Princeton. He became a Captain in the Second Rhode Island in January, 1777 where he saw service at the Battles of Red Bank, Monmouth, Rhode Island, and Springfield, where he was wounded. By act of Congress the 2nd Rhode Island and 1st Rhode Island were merged along with Sherburne's Battilion and served at the siege of Yorktown under Lafayette. Captain Olney lead the American sappers over the top of Redoubt 10, calling back to his troops "in a tone as if there were no danger, Capt. Olney's company form here". Armed with only an espontoon, he was immediately attacked by 6 to 8 bayonets. The Americans took the redoubt in about 10 minutes, but Capt. Olney was badly wounded including a bayonet in the gut which was thought to be fatal. He was sent to the hospital in Williamsburg where he recovered and returned to his regiment 3 weeks later. He resigned in May, of 1782, stating in a letter to General Washington that since the war was over, he felt it was not honorable to remain in the Army waiting to be paid.  He returned to Providence and subsequently represented North Providence in the legislature for twenty years, besides holding various other town offices. Olney was also an Original Member with the Rhode Island Society of the Cincinnati.

Family
Olney's ancestor Thomas Olney was one of the founders of Rhode Island and was the second pastor of the first Baptist Church in America.

Charles L. Hodges, Olney's great-grandson, was a career officer in the U.S. Army and attained the rank of major general.

See also

 Capt. Stephen Olney House

References

Additional reading
 This work in turn cites:
 Catherine Williams, Lives of Barton and Olney  (Providence, 1839)

External links

 American Revolution Institute 
 Society of the Cincinnati

1755 births
1832 deaths
Politicians from Providence, Rhode Island
Continental Army soldiers
Continental Army officers from Rhode Island
People of Rhode Island in the American Revolution
Members of the Rhode Island General Assembly
Patriots in the American Revolution